In telecommunication, 4B5B is a form of data communications line code. 4B5B maps groups of 4 bits of data onto groups of 5 bits for transmission. These 5-bit words are pre-determined in a dictionary and they are chosen to ensure that there will be sufficient transitions in the line state to produce a self-clocking signal. A collateral effect of the code is that 25% more bits are needed to send the same information. 

An alternative to using 4B5B coding is to use a scrambler. Some systems use scramblers in conjunction with 4B5B coding to assure DC balance and improve electromagnetic compatibility.

Depending on the standard or specification of interest, there may be several 5-bit output codes left unused.  The presence of any of the unused codes in the data stream can be used as an indication that there is a fault somewhere in the link.  Therefore, the unused codes can be used to detect errors in the data stream.

Applications
4B5B was popularized by Fiber Distributed Data Interface (FDDI) in the mid-1980s. It was adopted for digital audio transmission by MADI in 1989. and by Fast Ethernet in 1995.

The name 4B5B is generally taken to mean the FDDI version.  Other 4-to-5-bit codes have been used for magnetic recording and are known as group coded recording (GCR), but those are (0,2) run-length limited codes, with at most two consecutive zeros.  4B5B allows up to three consecutive zeros (a (0,3) RLL code), providing a greater variety of control codes.

On optical fiber, the 4B5B output is NRZI-encoded. FDDI over copper (CDDI) uses MLT-3 encoding instead, as does 100BASE-TX Fast Ethernet.

The 4B5B encoding is also used for USB Power Delivery communication, where it is sent over the USB-C CC pin (further encoded using biphase mark code) or the USB-A/B power lines (further encoded using frequency-shift keying).

Clocking
4B5B codes are designed to produce at least two transitions per 5 bits of output code regardless of input data. The transitions provide necessary transitions for the receiver to perform clock recovery.  For example, a run of 4 bits such as 0000 using NRZI encoding contains no transitions and that may cause clocking problems for the receiver. 4B5B solves this problem by assigning the 4-bit block a 5-bit code, in this case, 11110.

Encoding table

Three consecutive zero bits only appear in normal data when a code ending with two 0 bits (2, E) is followed by a code beginning with a 0 bit (1, 4, 5, 6, 7), so will always appear separated by multiples of the 5-bit encoded symbol length (and never separated by a single symbol).  Violations of this property are used for special synchronization codes.

Command characters

The following codes are sometimes referred to as command characters.  They are commonly used in pairs, although USB-PD uses 4-symbol sequences to begin its packets.

See also 
 GCR 4B-5B encoding

References

External links 
 Simulator - 4B/5B Encoder line written in Matlab
 CodSim 2.0: Open source simulator for Digital Data Communications Model at the University of Malaga written in HTML

Telecommunications standards
Line codes